Koziniec may refer to the following places in Poland:
Koziniec, Lower Silesian Voivodeship (south-west Poland)
Koziniec, Podlaskie Voivodeship (north-east Poland)
Koziniec, Lesser Poland Voivodeship (south Poland)